Bullfrog is a common English language term to refer to large, aggressive frogs, regardless of species.

Examples of bullfrogs include:

Frog species

America
Helmeted water toad (Calyptocephalella gayi), endemic to Chile
American bullfrog (Lithobates catesbeianus), indigenous to North America
Cane toad (Rhinella marina), a toad indigenous to Central and South America, called 'bullfrog' in the Philippines

Australia
Limnodynastes dorsalis, found in Southwest Australia
Limnodynastes dumerilii, found in Western Australia
Giant banjo frog (Limnodynastes interioris), found in Eastern Australia

Africa
African bullfrog (Pyxicephalus adspersus), found in central and southern Africa
Calabresi's bullfrog (Pyxicephalus obbianus), found in Somalia
Crowned bullfrog (Hoplobatrachus occipitalis), found in much of Africa
Edible bullfrog (Pyxicephalus edulis), found in much of Africa

Asia
Banded bullfrog (Kaloula pulchra), found in Southeast Asia
Chinese edible frog (Hoplobatrachus rugulosus) or East Asian Bullfrog, found in China and Southeast Asia
Hoplobatrachus crassus or Jerdon's bullfrog, found in India
Hoplobatrachus tigerinus or Indus Valley bullfrog, found in Pakistan and North India

See also
Bullfrog (disambiguation)
Frog (disambiguation)
Cane toads (disambiguation)
Toad (disambiguation)

Former disambiguation pages converted to set index articles